The Mikulin AM-42 was a 1940s Soviet aircraft piston engine designed by Alexander Mikulin. Representing a high-output version of the AM-38F, the AM-42 was used in the Ilyushin Il-1 fighter, and the Il-8 and Il-10 ground attack aircraft.

Design and development
The AM-42 was a low-altitude engine for attack aircraft that evolved from the earlier AM-38F.  Compared to the AM-38F it had a reduced compression ratio, increased supercharging, strengthened and counterbalanced crankshaft, strengthened connecting rods, strengthened pistons and a revised oil system.  The AM-42 was developed by the design bureau of Factory No. 24  now called the Salyut factory in Moscow.  The first examples were produced in November 1942 and passed its 50-hour Factory tests in January 1943.  

In September 1943 the AM-42 began State tests but these were unfinished due to piston damage while testing.  A strengthened version of the AM-42 completed its State tests in spring 1944. The AM-42 was produced in large numbers between 1944–1948 and an improved 400 hour service life version was produced from 1951–1954.  The majority of engines were produced at Factory No. 24 which was evacuated to Kuybyshev at the end of 1941.

10,232 engines were built by the time it was phased out of production in the USSR in 1954.  In addition to being produced in the USSR it was also produced in Czechoslovakia as the M-42 at the Dimitrov factory to power the Avia B-33, a Czech built version of the Il-10.

Variants
 AM-42TK: A version with a TK-300B turbo-supercharger.
 AM-42FNV: A fuel injected version.
 AM-42B-TK: A version with two TK-300B turbo-superchargers.
 AM-42FB-TK: A version with two TK-1A turbo-superchargers.

Specifications (AM-42)

See also

References

Notes

Bibliography

 Gunston, Bill. World Encyclopedia of Aero Engines. Cambridge, England. Patrick Stephens Limited, 1989. 
 Kotelnikov, Vladimir. Russian Piston Aero Engines. Marlborough, Wiltshire. The Crowood Press Ltd. 2005. . 

Mikulin aircraft engines
1940s aircraft piston engines
V12 aircraft engines